Lučivná is a village and municipality in Poprad District in the Prešov Region of northern Slovakia. It lies on the foothills oh High Tatras. It is a small spa village.

Geography
The municipality lies at an elevation of 767 metres (2,516 ft) and covers an area of 18.766 km2 (7.246 mi2). It has a population of about 975 people.

History
In historical records the village was first mentioned in 1321.

Infrastructure and economy
Part of the village municipality is Lopušná dolina with a lot of recreational and sporting facilities. In the village are classical evangelical and Roman Catholic churches and a manor house.

References

External links
https://web.archive.org/web/20160731204335/http://lucivna.e-obce.sk/
http://www.tkl.sk/ Spa information for children
http://www.vodnesvety.sk/kupele-lucivna Spa Lučivná information
https://web.archive.org/web/20120109210910/http://slovakiainn.sk/sk/index.php?page=h_uvod&hotel=3 Slovakia Inn
http://www.kastiellucivna.sk/ Manor house homepage

Villages and municipalities in Poprad District